Ali Mudassar (born 2 April 1989) is a Pakistani cricketer. He played in twelve first-class and eleven List A matches between 2009 and 2015. He made his Twenty20 debut on 7 February 2014, for Larkana Bulls in the 2013–14 National T20 Cup.

References

External links
 

1989 births
Living people
Pakistani cricketers
Karachi Whites cricketers
Place of birth missing (living people)